The Bengali–Assamese script, also known as Eastern Nagari, is a modern eastern Indic script that emerged from the Brahmi script. Gaudi script is considered the ancestor of the script. It is known as Bengali script among Bengali speakers, as Assamese script among Assamese speakers, and Eastern-Nāgarī is used in academic discourses.
It is one of official scripts of the Indian Republic for being used officially by Assamese language, Bengali language and Meitei language (officially called "Manipuri"), three of the 22 official languages of the Indian Republic.

Besides Bengali and Assamese it is used to write Bishnupriya, Chakma, Meitei (Manipuri), Santali and other languages—historically, it was used for old and middle Indo-Aryan and it is still used for Sanskrit.  Other languages, such as Bodo, Karbi, Maithili and Mising were once written in this script. The two major alphabets in this script – Assamese and Bengali – are virtually identical, except for two characters, with Assamese differing from Bengali in one letter for the /r/ sound, and an extra letter for the /w/ or /v/ sound.

History

The Bengali—Assamese script was originally not associated with any particular regional language, but was prevalent as the main script in the eastern regions of Medieval India for Old- and Middle-Indo-Aryan including Sanskrit. All of these eastern Magadhan scripts are based on a system of characters historically related to, but distinct from, Devanagari. Brahmi, an ancient Indian syllabary, is the source of most native Indian scripts including the South Indian languages and Devanagari, the script associated with classical Sanskrit and other Indo-Aryan languages.

The modern eastern scripts (Bengali-Assamese, Odia, and Maithili) became clearly differentiated around the 14th and 15th centuries from the predecessor Gaudi. While the scripts in Bengal, Assam and Mithila remained similar to each other the Odia script developed a curved top in the 13th-14th century and became increasingly different.  Old Maithili also used a script similar to the Bengali–Assamese script, and Maithili scholars (particularly of the older generation) still write Sanskrit in that script.

Modern Bengali–Assamese script saw further standardisations following the introduction of printing.

Printing
Though there were early attempts to cut Bengali types it was the East India Company's interest in propagating the Bengali language that ultimately prevailed. It first commissioned Willem Bolt, a Dutch adventurer, to create a grammar for Bengali, but he had to leave India after he ran into trouble with the company. The first significant book with Bengali typography was Halhed's 1778 "A Grammar of the Bengal Language" which he compiled from a meagre set of six Bengali manuscripts. When Halhed turned to Warren Hastings for publishing, he was referred to Charles Wilkins, the type-founder at the Company press at Hoogly. Learned in Sanskrit and Persian, Wilkins singlehandedly cut the most complete set. He was assisted by the Bengali blacksmith, Panchanan Karmakar, who is often erroneously credited as the father of the Bengali type.

Script

In this and other articles on Wikipedia dealing with the Assamese and Bengali languages, a Romanization scheme used by linguists specialising in Bengali phonology and a separate Assamese transliteration table used by linguists specialising in Assamese phonology are included along with IPA transcription.

Alphabets
There are three major modern alphabets in this script: Bengali, Assamese, and Tirhuta.  Modern Assamese is very similar to modern Bengali. Assamese has at least one extra letter, that Bengali does not. It also uses a separate letter for the sound 'ro'  different from the letter used for that sound in Bengali  and the letter  is not a conjunct as in Bengali, but a letter by itself.  The alphabetical orders of the two alphabets also differ, in the position of the letter , for example. Languages like Meitei and Bishnupriya use a hybrid of the two alphabets, with the Bengali  and the Assamese . Tirhuta is more different and carries forward some forms used in medieval Assamese.

Vowels and diacritics
The script presently has a total of 11 vowel letters, used to represent the seven vowel sounds of Bengali and eight vowel sounds of Assamese, along with a number of vowel diphthongs. All of these vowel letters are used in both Assamese and Bengali. Some of the vowel letters have different sounds depending on the word, and a number of vowel distinctions preserved in the writing system are not pronounced as such in modern spoken Bengali or Assamese. For example, the script has two symbols for the vowel sound [i] and two symbols for the vowel sound [u]. This redundancy stems from the time when this script was used to write Sanskrit, a language that had a short  and a long , and a short  and a long . These letters are preserved in the script with their traditional names of "short i" and "long i", etc., despite the fact that they are no longer pronounced differently in ordinary speech.

Some language specific usages 
In the Bengali alphabet,  is used when the intended pronunciation would otherwise be ambiguous. Some other languages use a vowel  to denote // which is not found in either Bengali or Assamese; and though the vowel diacritic (matra) is found in Tirhuta the vowel letter itself is absent.
 

When no vowel Diacritic symbol is written, then the vowel "" (ô) is the default inherited vowel for the consonant. To specifically denote the absence of a vowel, a hôsôntô (্) may be written underneath the consonant.

Consonants
The names of the consonant letters in Eastern Nagari are typically just the consonant's main pronunciation plus the inherent vowel "" ô. Since the inherent vowel is assumed and not written, most letters' names look identical to the letter itself (e.g. the name of the letter "" is itself  ghô, not gh). Some letters that have lost their distinctive pronunciation in Modern Assamese and Bengali are called by a more elaborate name.

Digits

In Unicode 

There are two Unicode blocks for Bengali–Assamese script, called Bengali and Tirhuta. The Bengali block is U+0980–U+09FF:

The Tirhuta block is
U+11480–U+114DF:

Notes

References

See also 
 Naoriya Phullo script
 Official scripts of the Indian Republic

External links 
 Omniglot – Assamese Alphabet
 Omniglot – Bengali Alphabet

Bengali script
Brahmic scripts
Officially used writing systems of India